Cláudio Luís Assunção de Freitas (born 31 March 1972) is a former Brazilian football player.

Club statistics

References

External links

Cerezo Osaka

1972 births
Living people
Brazilian footballers
Brazilian expatriate footballers
União São João Esporte Clube players
CR Flamengo footballers
Sociedade Esportiva Palmeiras players
Santos FC players
América Futebol Clube (SP) players
Expatriate footballers in Japan
J1 League players
Shonan Bellmare players
Cerezo Osaka players
Association football defenders
Footballers from São Paulo